Russell Stanley Berkey (August 4, 1893 – June 17, 1985) was an admiral in the United States Navy during World War II.

Admiral Berkey was a native of Indiana and graduated from the United States Naval Academy in 1916. Following graduation he served on board the battleship . Between 1918 and 1942 he served in variety of assignments, including as flag secretary to commander, Destroyer Force, Atlantic Fleet and as flag lieutenant to commander, Battleship Division Four. He completed two deployments as commanding officer aboard , which patrolled the Yangtze River in China.

Following the start of World War II he was assigned to command the cruiser  and became her first captain in 1942. Later as a rear admiral he commanded a cruiser division and task force during the battle of Battle of Leyte Gulf and Corregidor invasion operations. His flagship at this time was the cruiser . He also commanded the right flank cruisers and destroyers during the Battle of Surigao Strait and was subsequently awarded the Navy Cross for his combat leadership. Following the war he served as commander of the Seventh Fleet from August 28, 1949, until April 5, 1950, and then Commander U.S. Naval Forces, Far East.

He retired in September 1950, and died in 1985.

References

Sources
 Morison, Samuel Eliot. History of United States Naval Operations in World War II
  New York Times Obituary from 1985
  Former U.S. Seventh Fleet Commanders
  U.S. Navy at Corregidor
 Navy Cross Citation

1893 births
1985 deaths
People from Goshen, Indiana
United States Navy admirals
United States Naval Academy alumni
United States Navy personnel of World War I
United States Navy World War II admirals
Recipients of the Navy Cross (United States)
Recipients of the Navy Distinguished Service Medal